The Project 2049 Institute is a think tank in Arlington, Virginia focusing on United States foreign policy in the Asia-Pacific region, particularly as it relates to China and Taiwan.

The institute was founded in 2008 by former Assistant Secretary of Defense for Indo-Pacific Security Affairs Randall Schriver and former US Air Force Lieutenant Colonel Mark Stokes. Former U.S. Deputy Secretary of State Richard Armitage served as chairman until January 2020.

The institute is strongly supportive of Taiwan, and has called for full normalization of relations between the United States and Taiwan.

In February 2020 Taiwanese President Tsai Ing-wen received Project 2049 Institute chairman Randall Schriver at the Presidential Office in Taipei.

References

External links 
 

Think tanks established in 2008
Foreign policy and strategy think tanks in the United States
China-focused think tanks
2008 establishments in Virginia
Non-profit organizations based in Arlington, Virginia